Cleora leucophaea is a species of moth in the family Geometridae. It is found in East Asia (Russia, Taiwan, Japan, South Korea).

Subspecies
Cleora leucophaea leucophaea
Cleora leucophaea taiwanensis Sato, 2002

See also 
 List of moths of Taiwan
 List of moths of Russia (Geometroidea-Bombycoidea)
 List of moths of Japan (Bombycoidea-Geometroidea)

References

External links 
 Cleora leucophaea at insectoid.info

Moths described in 1878
 
Moths of Asia